Giao Thủy is a rural district of Nam Định province in the Red River Delta region of Vietnam. As of 2003 the district had a population of 207,273. The district covers an area of 166 km². The district capital lies at Ngô Đồng and other towns and villages include Giao Xuân, Giao Phong.

History

References

Districts of Nam Định province